Abdulkhakim Shapiyev (born December 4, 1983 in Dagestan ASSR, Soviet Union) is a Russian and Kazakhstani male freestyle wrestler of Avar heritage.

External links
 bio on fila-wrestling.com
 2012 Summer Olympics Profile

Living people
1983 births
Kazakhstani male sport wrestlers
Kazakhstani people of Russian descent
Russian expatriate sportspeople in Kazakhstan
Sportspeople from Moscow
Wrestlers at the 2012 Summer Olympics
Olympic wrestlers of Kazakhstan
Asian Games medalists in wrestling
Wrestlers at the 2006 Asian Games
World Wrestling Championships medalists
Asian Games bronze medalists for Kazakhstan
Medalists at the 2006 Asian Games
Asian Wrestling Championships medalists
21st-century Kazakhstani people